is a Japanese manga series written and illustrated by Kazuyoshi Takeda. It was serialized in Hakusensha's seinen manga magazine Young Animal from February 2016 to April 2021 and has been collected in eleven tankōbon volumes. A spin-off manga titled Peleliu Gaiden began serialization in Young Animal in July 2021. An anime adaptation has been announced.

Synopsis
The story is set on the island of Peleliu taking part in the Battle of Peleliu during World War II and follows Private Tamaru during the summer of 1944. Unfortunately for Tamaru, a young soldier simply wishing to become a mangaka, he will quickly find himself in the heart of a terrible battlefield, where 10,000 Japanese soldiers will do their best to resist the onslaught of 40,000 American soldiers. Their only instruction: resist until the last.

Media

Manga
Peleliu: Guernica of Paradise is written and illustrated by Kazuyoshi Takeda. The series was published in Hakusensha's Young Animal from February 12, 2016, to April 9, 2021. The series has been collected in eleven tankōbon volumes as of July 2021.

A spin-off, titled Peleliu Gaiden, was announced at the end of the series in April 2021. It began serialization in Young Animal on July 21, 2021.

Volume list

Peleliu Gaiden

Anime
In April 2021, it was announced at the end of the manga's final chapter that the series will receive an anime adaptation.

Reception
Peleliu: Guernica of Paradise was one of the Manga division's Jury Selections at the 20th and 21st Japan Media Arts Festival in 2017 and 2018. The series was ranked at #12 in the 2018 edition of Takarajimasha's Kono Manga ga Sugoi! list of best manga for male readers. The series also won the Excellence Award at the 46th Japan Cartoonists Association Awards. In 2021, it was nominated for the 25th Tezuka Osamu Cultural Prize and was ranked at #9 in the 2021 edition of Takarajimasha's Kono Manga ga Sugoi! list of best manga for male readers. The manga was again nominated for the 26th Tezuka Osamu Cultural Prize in 2022.

See also
Sayonara, Tama-chan, another manga series by the same author

References

External links
 

Anime series based on manga
Hakusensha manga
Historical anime and manga
Military anime and manga
Peleliu
Seinen manga